(The tempest) is a German-language opera in three acts and an epilogue by the Swiss composer Frank Martin to a libretto based on the Schlegel/Tieck German translation of Shakespeare's play The Tempest. Martin's only opera was premiered at the Vienna State Opera on 17 June 1956. The role of Prospero was originally conceived for Dietrich Fischer-Dieskau, but illness prevented him participating, although Casaglia lists Fischer-Dieskau in the role of Sebastian, but a playbill for the premiere lists  in that role.

The word setting is through-composed parlando, with few set pieces, most of which belong to Prospero.

Roles

Recordings
 Extracts: Dietrich Fischer-Dieskau (Prospero), Berlin Philharmonic conducted by the composer, Deutsche Grammophon 1964
 Live recording: Robert Holl as Prospero, Christine Buffle as Miranda, Simon O'Neill as Ferdinand, James Gilchrist as Antonio, Ethan Herschenfeld as Alonso, Netherlands Radio Philharmonic Orchestra and Netherlands Radio Choir, conductor Thierry Fischer, Hyperion 2012. International Classical Music Awards 2012, Gramophone Editor's Choice, Gramophone Critics' Choice 2011, Diapason d'Or

References

External links
 "Frank Martin: Der Sturn (First version)", work details, incl. score manuscript, Universal Edition
 , from Deutsche Grammophon 1964
 , Dietrich Fischer-Dieskau, from Deutsche Grammophon 1964
 , Dietrich Fischer-Dieskau, from Deutsche Grammophon 1964

Compositions by Frank Martin
Operas
1956 operas
German-language operas
Operas based on The Tempest